Wasta is a town in Pennington County, South Dakota, United States, situated along the Cheyenne River. It had a population of 65 at the 2020 census.

History
A post office called Wasta has been in operation since 1907. Wasta is a name derived from the Dakota word "wašté", meaning "good".

Geography
Wasta is located at  (44.068638, -102.445108). It sits along Interstate 90 in the western part of South Dakota.

Wasta has been assigned the ZIP code 57791 and the FIPS place code 69140.

Climate

Demographics

2010 census
As of the census of 2010, there were 80 people, 36 households, and 20 families living in the town. The racial makeup of the town was 100.0% White. Hispanic or Latino of any race were 1.3% of the population.

There were 36 households, of which 25.0% had children under the age of 18 living with them, 44.4% were married couples living together, 11.1% had a female householder with no husband present, and 44.4% were non-families. 33.3% of all households were made up of individuals, and 11.1% had someone living alone who was 65 years of age or older. The average household size was 2.22 and the average family size was 2.90.

The median age in the town was 40.5 years. 22.5% of residents were under the age of 18; 11.3% were between the ages of 18 and 24; 22.6% were from 25 to 44; 22.6% were from 45 to 64; and 21.3% were 65 years of age or older. The gender makeup of the town was 52.5% male and 47.5% female.

2000 census
As of the census of 2000, there were 75 people, 35 households, and 19 families living in the town. The population density was 390.7 people per square mile (152.4/km2). There were 46 housing units at an average density of 239.6 per square mile (93.5/km2). The racial makeup of the town was 98.67% White and 1.33% Asian. Hispanic or Latino of any race were 1.33% of the population.

There were 35 households, out of which 25.7% had children under the age of 18 living with them, 42.9% were married couples living together, 2.9% had a female householder with no husband present, and 45.7% were non-families. 37.1% of all households were made up of individuals, and 17.1% had someone living alone who was 65 years of age or older. The average household size was 2.14 and the average family size was 2.63.

In the town, the population was spread out, with 22.7% under the age of 18, 5.3% from 18 to 24, 28.0% from 25 to 44, 21.3% from 45 to 64, and 22.7% who were 65 years of age or older. The median age was 38 years. For every 100 females, there were 108.3 males. For every 100 females age 18 and over, there were 123.1 males.

The median income for a household in the town was $26,375, and the median income for a family was $26,250. Males had a median income of $30,000 versus $25,000 for females. The per capita income for the town was $13,888. There were 17.6% of families and 15.7% of the population living below the poverty line, including 38.1% of under eighteens and none of those over 64.

In popular culture

The Redwood Motel in Wasta was used extensively as a filming site for the movie Thunderheart.

References

Towns in South Dakota
Towns in Pennington County, South Dakota
Rapid City, South Dakota metropolitan area